The Netherlands women's national handball team is the national handball team of the Netherlands. It is governed by the Nederlands Handbal Verbond (NHV).

Results

Olympic Games

World Championship
Since their first appearance in 1971, The Netherlands has participated in twelve World Championship. They were crowned world champions for the first time in 2019 after beating Spain (30–29) in the final.

European Championship
Since their first appearance in 1998, The Netherlands has participated in seven European Championship.

Other tournaments

 Carpathian Trophy 2004 – Third place
 Holland Handball Tournament 2006 – Fifth place
 Carpathian Trophy 2016 – Third place

Team

Current squad
Squad for the Golden League Tournament in Eindhoven in February-March 2023.

Head coach: Per Johansson

Caps and goals as of 28 February 2023.

Extended squad
Players who have been called up in the 35-player squad for the 2022 European Women's Handball Championship.

Coaching staff

Notable players
MVP
 Nycke Groot (centre back), 2016 European Championship
 Estavana Polman (centre back), 2019 World Championship

Top Scorer
 Lois Abbingh (left back) with 71 goals, 2019 World Championship

All-Star Team members
 Pearl van der Wissel (left back), 2005 World Championship
 Tess Wester (goalkeeper), 2015 World Championship, 2019 World Championship
 Nycke Groot (centre back), 2016 European Championship
 Lois Abbingh (left back), 2017 World Championship
 Yvette Broch (line player), 2016 European Championship, 2017 World Championship
 Kelly Dulfer (defender), 2018 European Championship
 Estavana Polman (centre back), 2019 World Championship
Coaches
  Toon Wijdeveld (1956–1957)
  Paul Broere (1960)
  Jan Kloen (1961–1966, 1968)
  Jaroslav Mráz (1968–1971)
  Jo Gerris (1971–1973)
  Jan Alma (1973–1974)
  Heinz Henneberg (1974–1975)
  George van Noesel (1975–1976)
  Jan Alma (1976–1978)
  Simon Flendrie (1979)
  Ilona Venema-Ignácz (1979–1981)
  Jan Kecskeméthy (1982–1986)
  Jan Tuik (1986)
  Ton van Linder (1987–1990)
  Bert Bouwer (1990–2003)
  Kari Aagaard (2003)
  Olaf Schimpf (2003–2004)
  Sjors Röttger (2004–2008)
  Henk Groener (2009–2016)
  Helle Thomsen (2016–2018)
  Emmanuel Mayonnade (2019–2021)
  Monique Tijsterman (2021)
  Per Johansson (2022–present)

Individual all-time records

Most matches played
Total number of matches played for the senior national team.

Last updated: 4 November 2021

Most goals scored
Total number of goals scored in official matches only.

Last updated: 4 November 2021

References

External links

IHF profile

National team
Women's national handball teams
Hand